The 2018 FIBA U20 European Championship Division B was the 14th edition of the Division B of the FIBA U20 European Championship, the second-tier level of the European Under-20 basketball championship. The tournament was played in Sofia, Bulgaria, from 13 to 22 July 2018.

Participating teams

  (15th place, 2017 FIBA U20 European Championship Division A)

  (16th place, 2017 FIBA U20 European Championship Division A)

  (14th place, 2017 FIBA U20 European Championship Division A)

Group phase
In the Group phase, the 22 participating teams are divided into two groups of six and two groups of five. Teams play five or four games within their group.

All times are local (UTC+3).

Group A

Group B

Group C

Group D

17th−22nd place classification

Group E

Group F

21st place game

19th place game

17th place game

9th−16th place playoffs

Championship playoffs

Quarterfinals

5th–8th place semifinals

Semifinals

Seventh place game

Fifth place game

Third place game

Final

Final standings

References

External links
FIBA official website

FIBA U20 European Championship Division B
FIBA Europe Under-20 Championship, Div B
2018–19 in Bulgarian basketball
2018 in youth sport
International youth basketball competitions hosted by Bulgaria
Sports competitions in Sofia
July 2018 sports events in Europe